Piedmont Wildlife Center is a 501(c)3 non-profit organization located in Durham, North Carolina, United States. The center conducts programs in nature education and wildlife conservation.

Mission 
Inspiring people to develop a positive lifelong connection with nature & encouraging active engagement in conservation. Piedmont Wildlife Center accomplishes this mission through a community oriented approach to nature education, leadership development and conservation science.

Facility 
The Piedmont Wildlife Center was founded in 2003. The office is located at Leigh Farm Park which is an 82.8 acre city park in South Durham. The center itself is located in a log cabin at the end of the Leigh Farm road.  This is the location of their main office and outdoor raptor viewing exhibits.

Efforts

Piedmont Wildlife Center's nature education programs reach adults, teens, and children in the Triangle Region of North Carolina. The programs feature hands on experiences with a focus on primitive skills, field natural history, nature conservation and community leadership. They are inspired by the tradition of Coyote Mentoring, established by the Eight Shields Institute.

Piedmont Wildlife Center supports conservation projects with a goal of developing a greater understanding of the current state of bio-diversity in the greater Piedmont area in order to conserve local species and habitats.

Biological Inventory 
Leigh Farm Park (home of PWC) is a critical biological buffer area that links a chain of ecosystems across the Piedmont region, maintaining a wildlife corridor across central North Carolina and beyond. The park and the surrounding North Carolina Wildlife Resources Commission (NCWRC) area include five habitat types: bottomland hardwood forest, upland hardwood forest, pine forest, forested wetlands and fields.

Habitat fragmentation is a significant threat to wildlife. As a means of habitat protection, Piedmont Wildlife Center (PWC), associated scientists, and volunteers are currently surveying the biodiversity of Leigh Farm Park. Past survey methods have included animal tracking, the use of trail cameras, and GPS and GIS software.

The goal of this ongoing inventory is to inform a more complete understanding of the current condition of diversity in the parklands—this information shapes the education and outreach programs PWC organizes in support of biodiversity in the greater Piedmont area.

External links
The Piedmont Wildlife Center website
Guide to the Piedmont Wildlife Center Records 2003-2009

Nature centers in North Carolina
Organizations based in Durham, North Carolina
Education in Durham, North Carolina
Protected areas of Durham County, North Carolina
Tourist attractions in Durham, North Carolina